Jack Bedwell (9 July 1915 – 11 March 1988) was an English cricketer. He played one first-class match for Bengal in 1940/41.

See also
 List of Bengal cricketers

References

External links
 

1915 births
1988 deaths
English cricketers
Bengal cricketers
People from Royston, Hertfordshire
Cricketers from Hertfordshire